Anni Holdmann (28 January 1900 in Hamburg - 2 November 1960) was a German athlete who competed mainly in the 100 metres.

She competed for Germany in the 1928 Summer Olympics held in Amsterdam, Netherlands in the 4 x 100 metres where she won the bronze medal with her teammates Rosa Kellner, Leni Schmidt and Leni Junker.

References

1900 births
1960 deaths
German female sprinters
Olympic bronze medalists for Germany
Athletes (track and field) at the 1928 Summer Olympics
Olympic athletes of Germany
Athletes from Hamburg
Place of birth missing
Medalists at the 1928 Summer Olympics
Olympic bronze medalists in athletics (track and field)
Olympic female sprinters
20th-century German women